André Filipe Santos Galvão (born 27 July 1992) is a Portuguese futsal player who is a pivot for Viseu 2001 and the Portugal national team.

References

External links

1992 births
Living people
Portuguese men's futsal players
Sporting CP futsal players